Marshall Forest is located in Floyd County, in Georgia,  outside the Rome city limits. It is one of the few remaining old-growth forests in Northwest Georgia. Marshall Forest is referred to as the only virgin forest within city limits of any city in the USA. More than 300 species of plants, and fifty-five tree species live within the forest, together with numerous animals indigenous to the area.

History 
The land was passed down the Marshall family until it reached Maclean Marshall, naturalist and philanthropist, who had the land dedicated as a Natural National Landmark on October 12, 1966. Marshall Forest was the first Natural National Landmark in the state of Georgia.
In 1985,  were added to the forest on the Mt. Alto side. These parts were not part of the original purchase by the Marshall family. Now only seventy-five to one hundred acres of the original forest remain uncut.

Forest life 
Marshall Forest supports more than three hundred species of plants. Among them is the endangered Large-flowered Skullcap. The forest houses the largest population of these flowers in the state of Georgia and the second largest population in the United States. Several kinds of mushrooms also grow in the forest. The forest contains fifty-five trees species, such as pine-oak, chestnut oak, and mixed hardwoods.

Numerous indigenous animals call the forest home. Some of these include frogs, salamanders, and snakes. There are at least six different species of snakes in the forest. Dozens of different kinds of birds also live in among them.

Recreation 
Marshall Forest contains five self-guided walking trails, primarily on the Southwest side of the forest. The trails provide informational aides, including plant identification tags, and twenty stop-and-observe stations, with signs in both Braille and English. The Big Pine Braille Trail, is made specifically for the visually impaired. The trails are not cut over, allowing the undergrowth to spread onto the pathway.  Access to the forest is by appointment with the Nature Conservancy.

Management 
The forest is managed in part by two groups –Friends of Marshall Forest and the Georgia Chapter of the Nature Conservancy. The Nature Conservancy, founded nationally in 1951, has managed Marshall Forest for five years. Volunteers assist in nonprofit work such as boundary marking and removal of invasive species.

References

External links
Marshall Forest Preserve Nature Conservancy
Marshall Forest National Park Service

Protected areas of Floyd County, Georgia
Forests of Georgia (U.S. state)
National Natural Landmarks in Georgia (U.S. state)
Rome, Georgia
Protected areas established in 1966
Nature Conservancy preserves
Braille trail sites